The Art Institute of Atlanta is a private art school in Atlanta, Georgia. It is owned by Education Principle Foundation. The school is one of eight Art Institutes. It awards associate's and bachelor's degrees, including Bachelor of Fine Arts (BFA) degrees, Bachelor of Arts (BA) degrees, and Bachelor of Science (BS) degrees, and also offers diploma and non-degree programs.

History
The Art Institute of Atlanta was founded in 1949 as Massey Business College, with diploma programs in basic business and secretarial skills. The school added liberal arts, fashion, and interior design during the next two decades. 

In 1975, the school was acquired by Education Management Corporation (EDMC) and was renamed The Art Institute of Atlanta. The  college also shifted its focus to a creative applied arts curriculum. Located at 6600 Peachtree Dunwoody Road N.E., 100 Embassy Row, Atlanta, GA 30328 (the 5-story building was torn down around 2004.) Accreditation by the Commission on Colleges of the Southern Association of Colleges and Schools soon followed. 

In 1999, the college moved to its current location; a 5-story building in Sandy Springs and later expanded to a second building across the street. In 2004, the school added Audio Production to their growing list of programs. The newest program, Fashion & Retail Management, was added in January 2007. Student enrollment peaked by 2012. 

In 2017, EDMC, struggling financially, sold the Art Institute of Atlanta and 30 other Art Institute schools to Dream Center Education, a Los Angeles-based Pentecostal organization. By 2019–2020, Ai-Atlanta's enrollment had declined to 814.

Branches (closed)
Several Art Institutes schools were branches of the Art Institute of Atlanta. These branches are now closed.

 The Art Institute of Tennessee – Nashville
 The Art Institute of Washington
 The Art Institute of Charleston

Student outcomes
According to the National Center for Education Statistics, the Art Institute of Atlanta has a 21% graduation rate and a 15% student loan default rate.

References

External links
 Official website

Universities and colleges in Atlanta
Art schools in Georgia (U.S. state)
Atlanta
Educational institutions established in 1949
Private universities and colleges in Georgia (U.S. state)
Universities and colleges accredited by the Southern Association of Colleges and Schools
Design schools in the United States
Cooking schools in the United States
Graphic design schools in the United States
Fashion schools in the United States
For-profit universities and colleges in the United States
Film schools in the United States
1949 establishments in Georgia (U.S. state)